The Maryland Terrapins field hockey team is the intercollegiate field hockey program representing the University of Maryland. The school competes in the Big Ten Conference in Division I of the National Collegiate Athletic Association (NCAA), although it was a member of the Atlantic Coast Conference (ACC) before 2014. The Maryland field hockey team plays its home games at the Field Hockey & Lacrosse Complex on the university campus in College Park, Maryland. The Terrapins are among the most accomplished field hockey programs in the country, and they have won a total of eight NCAA national championships and 16 conference championships (10 in the ACC and 6 in the Big Ten). The team is currently coached by Missy Meharg.

History 
Field hockey has been a varsity sport at the University of Maryland since 1974. Between 1983 and 2013, the Terrapins competed as a member of the Atlantic Coast Conference (ACC). Beginning with the 2014 season, however, Maryland (along with Rutgers) has joined the Big Ten Conference, expanding it to nine field hockey members. The Terrapins are among the most accomplished field hockey programs in the country, amassing 12 conference championships (all but two in the ACC), eight NCAA national championships, and a record 57 wins in the NCAA tournament. In the entire history of the field hockey program, Maryland has only had two head coaches: Sue Tyler (1974–87) and Missy Meharg (1988–present). The program has been particularly successful under Meharg, who has guided the Terrapins to seven national titles, nine ACC Tournament titles, and 15 NCAA Final Four appearances while collecting nine National Coach of the Year awards herself.

Season-by-season results 

Season-by-season results through the end of the 2014 season

Honours

National championships
Maryland has achieved considerable success in the NCAA tournament, winning eight national championships as well as reaching 21 Final Fours in 34 total tournament appearances. In 1987, the Terrapins won their first NCAA title under Sue Tyler, defeating North Carolina in the final. Under the guidance of Missy Meharg since 1988, Maryland has amassed seven more national titles.

Conference championships
Maryland has won 16 conference titles, 10 of which were conference tournament championships in the Atlantic Coast Conference (ACC) with the other 6 being Big Ten Conference regular-season titles.

Notable players

Honda Award winners

All-Americans

Olympians

Awards and accolades through the end of the 2014 season

Internationals

 
 Lauren Barr
 Megan Frazer
 Lynsey McVicker
 Angela Platt
/
 Grace Balsdon

Stadium 
Maryland has played its home games at the Field Hockey & Lacrosse Complex since its opening in 2003. The facility, which the field hockey team shares with the school's women's lacrosse program, has a seating capacity of 2,000 as well as an AstroTurf 12 playing surface. The complex was built adjacent to the Xfinity Center, the home of the Maryland men's and women's basketball teams, which also houses field hockey locker rooms, showers, and training room facilities. Built in two stages, the Complex was fully completed in time for the Terrapins to host the 2005 ACC Tournament. The playing surface itself and a remote watering system were constructed during the first stage, while athletic training facilities, locker rooms, and a concourse-level plaza complete with restrooms and concession facilities were added in the second stage.

See also
List of NCAA Division I field hockey programs

References

External links